Rosebud Creek is a stream in the U.S. state of South Dakota. It takes its name from the nearby Rosebud Indian Reservation.

See also
List of rivers of South Dakota

References

Rivers of Todd County, South Dakota
Rivers of South Dakota